Jeon Ki-young (전기영, born 11 July 1973 in Cheongju, Chungcheongbuk-do) is a retired judoka who competed in the -78 kg and -86 kg divisions.

Jeon has won three consecutive world championships (1993, 1995 & 1997), twice beating the Hidehiko Yoshida in dramatic fashion in the finals.
He has also won six world cup titles.

The crowning moment in Jeon's judo career came in winning the gold medal in the men's middleweight division at the 1996 Olympics in Atlanta, U.S. He defeated Armen Bagdasarov of Uzbekistan in the final match by ippon. In his march to the gold, Jeon won every match by ippon, except the 1st round match against the Dutch judoka Mark Huizinga, who would go on to dominate the weight once Jeon himself retired.

Jeon retired from competition at a relatively young age of 25 in 1999, citing both knee injuries and an absence of motivation due to lack of competition. He retired undefeated in both Olympic and world championship competition.

In 2003, PRIDE FC and Antonio Inoki tried to sign Jeon to fight Yoshida under MMA rules (using the fact that Jeon have never lost against Yoshida in judo) but Jeon refused offers.

Championships & accomplishments 
 1997 World Championships 86 kg class in Paris, France – gold medal
 1997 French Open 86 kg class in Paris, France – gold medal
 1997 East Asian Games 86 kg class in Busan, Korea – silver medal
 1997 & 1994 Austrian Open 86 kg class in Leonding, Austria – gold medal
 1996 Olympic Games 86 kg class in Atlanta, Georgia, U.S. – gold medal
 1995 World Championships 86 kg class in Makuhari, Chiba, Japan – gold medal
 1995 Asian Championships 86 kg class in New Delhi, India – gold medal
 1995 Dutch Open 86 kg class in 's-Hertogenbosch, The Netherlands – gold medal
 1994 German Open 78 kg class in Munich, Germany – gold medal
 1993 World Championships 78 kg class in Hamilton, Canada – gold medal
 1993 French Open 78 kg class in Paris, France – gold medal

External links
 
 
 
 
 Judo Legend
 Youtube Video

1973 births
Living people
Judoka at the 1996 Summer Olympics
Olympic judoka of South Korea
Olympic medalists in judo
South Korean male judoka
World judo champions
Medalists at the 1996 Summer Olympics
Olympic gold medalists for South Korea
People from Cheongju